Sun Heart Music Hall is a concert hall in Yokohama, Japan. It has hosted concerts by some of Japan's most successful musicians. In 2008, pianist Atsuko Seta gave a recital in the hall.

References

External links 

Buildings and structures in Yokohama
Concert halls in Japan
Tourist attractions in Yokohama